Tirandazi (also Romanized as Tīrandāzī; also known as Bardīnū) is a village in Dar Agah Rural District, in the Central District of Hajjiabad County, Hormozgan Province, Iran. At the 2006 census, its population was 104, in 26 families.

References 

Populated places in Hajjiabad County